{{Infobox football club season
|club               = FC Astana
|season             = 2021
|manager            = Andrey Tikhonov    Nurken Mazbaev     Vladimir Yezhurov      Srdjan Blagojevic  {{small|(from 21 November)}} 
|chairman           = Sayan Khamitzhanov
|stadium            = Astana Arena
|league             = Premier League
|league result      = 2nd
|cup1               = Kazakhstan Cup
|cup1 result        = Semi-finals vs Kairat
|cup2               = Super Cup
|cup2 result        = Runners-up
|cup3               = 
|cup3 result        = 
|league topscorer   = Marin Tomasov (17) 
|season topscorer   = Marin Tomasov (22)
|highest attendance =   
|lowest attendance  = 
    
    
    
    
    
    
    
    
    
  
|average attendance =  
|prevseason         = 2020
|nextseason         = 2022
| pattern_la1 = _astana1718h
| pattern_b1  = _astana1718h
| pattern_ra1 = _astana1718h
| pattern_sh1 = _astana1718h
| pattern_so1 = _astana17h
| leftarm1    = FFFFFF
| body1       = FFFFFF
| rightarm1   = FFFFFF
| shorts1     = FFFFFF
| socks1      = ffff00
| pattern_la2 = _astana17a
| pattern_b2  = _astana17a
| pattern_ra2 = _astana17a
| pattern_sh2 = _astana17a
| pattern_so2 = _astana17a
| leftarm2    = FFFFFF
| body2       = FFFFFF
| rightarm2   = FFFFFF
| shorts2     = FFFFFF
| socks2      = 00AAFF
| pattern_la3 = _egito1819a
| pattern_b3  = _vorskla1819h
| pattern_ra3 = _egito1819a
| pattern_sh3 = 
| pattern_so3 = _3 stripes silver
| leftarm3    = FFFFFF
| body3       = FFFFFF
| rightarm3   = FFFFFF
| shorts3     = FFFFFF
| socks3      = FFFFFF
}}
The 2021 FC Astana season was the thirteenth successive season that Astana played in the Kazakhstan Premier League, the highest tier of association football in Kazakhstan. The finished the season 2nd, behind Tobol, reached the Semifinals of the Kazakhstan Cup and were knocked out of the Europa Conference League by KuPS at the Third Qualifying Round stage.

Season events
On 5 February, Astana sold Pieros Sotiriou to Ludogorets Razgrad, whilst Rúnar Már Sigurjónsson left Astana on 8 February.

On 15 February, Astana announced the signing of Varazdat Haroyan from Tambov. Three days later, Astana announced the signing of Semir Smajlagić from ND Gorica after he impressed on trial.

On 21 February, Astana announced the signing of Aleksandr Zarutskiy from Kaisar. Two days later, 23 February, Astana announced the return of Roman Murtazayev from Tobol.

On 2 March, Astana confirmed that Nenad Erić had left the club after 10 years, and that they had retired the #1 shirt, whilst also confirming the signing of Valeriu Ciupercă from Tambov.

On 16 March, Astana announced that they had re-signed Islambek Kuat after he'd previously played for the club between 2010 and 2014.

On 2 April, Astana signed Abat Aymbetov on loan from Krylia Sovetov until the summer transfer window.

On 7 April, Astana announced the signing of Cadete from Atlético San Luis.

Between the end of April and the start of May, Nurken Mazbaev took temporary charge of Astana whilst Andrey Tikhonov recovered from illness.

On 24 June, Astana announced the departure of Varazdat Haroyan to Cádiz, with defender Eneo Bitri signing for Astana the following day, 25 June.

On 13 July, Krylia Sovetov confirmed that Abat Aymbetov's loan deal with Astana had been extended until the end of the season.

On 16 July, Astana announced that Roman Murtazayev had left the club after his contract was terminated by mutual agreement.

On 5 November, Astana announced the departure of Andrey Tikhonov as their manager by mutual consent, with Antonio Rukavina announcing his retirement from football on 11 November.

On 21 November, Srdjan Blagojevic was announced as the clubs new head coach.

On 21 December, Astana signed new contracts with Aleksandr Zarutskiy and Abzal Beysebekov until the end of 2023, and Islambek Kuat until the end of 2024.

On 30 December, Astana announced that Valeriu Ciupercă had left the club after his contract was cancelled by mutual agreement.

The following day, Astana announced that Stanislav Basmanov, Vladislav Prokopenko, Sultan Sagnayev and Meyrambek Kalmyrza had all signed new contracts with the club.

Squad

On loan

Transfers

In

Loans in

Out

Loans out

Released

Trial

Friendlies

Competitions
Overview

Super Cup

Premier League

Results summary

Results by round

Results

 League table 

Kazakhstan Cup

Group stage

Knockout stages

UEFA Europa Conference League

Qualifying rounds

Squad statistics

Appearances and goals

|-
|colspan="16"|Players away from Astana on loan:|-
|colspan="16"|Players who left Astana during the season:''

|}

Goal scorers

Clean sheets

Disciplinary record

References

External links
Official Website 
Official VK

FC Astana seasons
Astana
Astana